Carex appalachica, the Appalachian sedge, is a species of flowering plant in the family Cyperaceae, native to the Appalachian Mountains of the United States and Canada. It is a member of the Carex rosea species group.

References

appalachica
Flora of Ontario
Flora of Quebec
Flora of Maine
Flora of Vermont
Flora of New Hampshire
Flora of Massachusetts
Flora of New York (state)
Flora of Connecticut
Flora of Ohio
Flora of Pennsylvania
Flora of New Jersey
Flora of Kentucky
Flora of West Virginia
Flora of Virginia
Flora of Maryland
Flora of Washington, D.C.
Flora of Tennessee
Flora of North Carolina
Flora of South Carolina
Flora of Alabama
Flora of Georgia (U.S. state)
Plants described in 1979
Flora without expected TNC conservation status